Joan Maynard may refer to:
 Joan Maynard (politician), English politician and trade unionist
 Joan Maynard (preservationist), American artist, author, community organizer, and preservationist
 Joan Ann Maynard, British actress